Matthew Sim (born 18 April 1988) is an Australian professional footballer who plays as a left or right sided / central midfielder for National Premier Leagues club Manly United. Matt also has an English passport through his family's heritage.

Playing career
Sim made his debut for Central Coast on 21 February against Wellington Phoenix. He played the whole game as the Mariners lost 4–1.

On 14 October 2014, Sim came off the bench in the 71st minute in Central Coast Mariners' FFA Cup clash with Palm Beach Sharks with the score at 1–0 to his side. He went on to score 4 goals in the 19 minutes that he played. Sim finished the 2014 FFA Cup with 5 goals in 3 games.

Sim has also been a part of two Asian Champions League campaigns for the Mariners in 2014 and 2015.

On 1 February 2016, the Western Sydney Wanderers announced that they had signed Sim until the end of the 2015–16 season.
On 5 May 2016, after making only one appearance off the bench for the club, Sim was released by the Wanderers.

Sim signed with South African Premier Division club Cape Town City in July 2016.

On 23 August 2016, Sim made his South African Premier Division competitive debut against Polokwane City in Cape Town City's inaugural game. Sim got an assist by setting up the first goal in the 2–0 win. Three days later Sim and Cape Town City took on Kaizer Chiefs in the MTN 8 Cup Quarter Final. Sim scored his first goal for the club in the 7th minute to give City a 1–0 win and a historic victory.

At the end of 2016, Sim left Cape Town City for personal reasons. He made 14 appearances in all competitions for the club.

Upon returning to Australia Sim joined former NSL giants Sydney United 58. Sim spent 5 successful seasons at the club in which he appeared in over 100 league games for the club and won the NSW NPL 2020 Grand final.

In 2022 Sim returned to Manly United Fc.

Honours

Club
Manly United
Waratah Cup: 2011

Cape Town City
 Telkom Knockout: 2016

Sydney United:
 National Premier Leagues NSW Championship: 2020

Individual
National Premier Leagues NSW Team of the Year: 2013

See also
 List of Central Coast Mariners FC players
 List of Western Sydney Wanderers FC players

References

http://www.sport24.co.za/Soccer/PSL/sim-rode-set-to-depart-cape-town-city-20161230
http://www.kickoff.com/news/73286/ex-cape-town-city-duo-matt-sim-renars-rode-join-sydney-united-58-fc-rigas-fs

External links
 

Living people
1988 births
Australian soccer players
Association football midfielders
Association football defenders
A-League Men players
Newcastle Jets FC players
Central Coast Mariners FC players
Western Sydney Wanderers FC players
Manly United FC players
Sutherland Sharks FC players
Cape Town City F.C. (2016) players
National Premier Leagues players
Sydney United 58 FC players